Heart to Heart is a 1949 American short documentary film about heart disease directed by Gunther von Fritsch. It was nominated for an Academy Award for Best Documentary Short.

References

External links

1949 films
1940s short documentary films
1949 documentary films
American short documentary films
Black-and-white documentary films
Documentary films about health care
Heart diseases
American black-and-white films
Films directed by Gunther von Fritsch
1940s English-language films
1940s American films